This list comprises all players who have participated in at least one league match for FC Dallas (formerly known as Dallas Burn) since the team's first Major League Soccer season in 1996. Players who were on the roster but never played a first team game are not listed; players who appeared for the team in other competitions (US Open Cup, CONCACAF Champions League, etc.) but never actually made an MLS appearance are noted at the bottom of the page.

A "†" denotes players who only appeared in a single match.

A
  Kellyn Acosta
  Abel Aguilar 
  Tesho Akindele
  Lazo Alavanja
  Eric Alexander
  Arturo Álvarez
  Damián Álvarez
  Leonel Álvarez
  Hamisi Amani-Dove
  Chad Ashton
  Eric Avila

B
  Bradlee Baladez †
  Michael Barrios
  Brian Bates
  Matt Behncke
  Kyle Bekker
  Jair Benítez
  Colin Bonner †
  Tenywa Bonseu
  Paul Broome
  Chris Brown †
  Michael Burke
  Ray Burse
  Carl Bussey

C
  Jeff Cassar
  Fabián Castillo
  Ronald Cerritos
  Marvin Chávez
  Ezequiel Cirigliano
  Kenny Cooper
  D. J. Countess
  Coy Craft
  Daniel Cruz
  Jeff Cunningham
  Ali Curtis

D
  Eric Dade
  Sergi Daniv
  Aubrey David
  Duilio Davino
  Kyle Davies
  Brad Davis
  Julian de Guzman
  Chad Deering
  Michael Dellorusso
  Denílson
  Mauro Díaz
  Mark Dodd
  Brian Dunseth

E
  Ted Eck
  Edson Edward †
  Gerell Elliott
  Erick
  Andrés Escobar
  Rolando Escobar
  Justin Evans

F
  Richard Farrer
  Raúl Fernández
  David Ferreira
  Maynor Figueroa
  Jorge Flores

G
  Maykel Galindo
  Danny Garcia
  Scott Garlick
  Chris Gbandi
  Getterson
  Cory Gibbs
  Jimmy Glenn
  Gavin Glinton
  Jesse Gonzalez
  Clarence Goodson
  Ariel Graziani
  Hernán Grana
  Carlos Gruezo
  Bruno Guarda
  Aaron Guillen

H
  Jeremy Hall
  Atiba Harris
  Kevin Hartman
  Eric Hassli
  Peter Hattrup
  Bryan Haynes
  Matt Hedges
  Daniel Hernández
  Moises Hernandez
  Ezra Hendrickson
  Shaka Hislop
  Ryan Hollingshead

I
  Zak Ibsen
  Ugo Ihemelu
  Ricardo Iribarren

J
  Jackson
  Andrew Jacobson
  Agustin Jara
  George John
  Eddie Johnson
  Steve Jolley
  Gabe Jones
  Matt Jordan
  Miles Joseph

K
  Stephen Keel
  Dan Kennedy
  John Kerr, Jr.
  Aleksey Korol
  Jason Kreis
  Luboš Kubík

L
  Garth Lagerwey
  Bryan Leyva
  Carlos Lizarazo
  Zach Loyd
  Lawrence Lozzano
  Peter Luccin
  Rubén Luna

M
  James Marcelin
  Peri Marošević
  Antonio Martínez
  Joey Martinez
  Ty Maurin
  Josué Mayard
  Dax McCarty
  Michel
  Roberto Miña
  Adam Moffat
  Drew Moor
  Justin Moore
  Lee Morrison
  Steve Morrow
  Richard Mulrooney

N
  Adauto Neto
  Toni Nhleko
  Johann Noetzel †
  Ramón Núñez

O
  Ronnie O'Brien
  Dominic Oduro
  Percy Olivares
  Juan Esteban Ortiz
  Rene Ortiz

P
  Óscar Pareja
  Heath Pearce
  Daniel Peinado
    Ricardo Pepi
  Luis Perea
  Blas Pérez
  Hernán Pertúz
  Aaron Pitchkolan
  Timo Pitter †
  Brandon Pollard
  Steve Purdy
  Ed Puskarich

Q
  Eric Quill

R
  Milton Reyes
  Bobby Rhine
  Ricardinho
  Pablo Ricchetti
  Angel Rivillo †
  André Rocha
  Carlos Rodríguez
  Esmundo Rodriguez
  Jorge Rodríguez
  Milton Rodríguez
  Washington Rodriguez
  Mauro Rosales
  Carlos Ruiz

S
  Darío Sala
  Philip Salyer
  Álvaro Sánchez
  Hugo Sánchez
  Mark Santel
  Maicon Santos
  Marcelo Saragosa
  Juan Sastoque
  Darren Sawatzky
  Scott Sealy
  Chris Seitz
  Adrian Serioux
  Brek Shea
  Victor Sikora
  Chris Snitko
  Tom Soehn
  Diego Soñora
  Dan Stebbins
  Jack Stewart
  Jordan Stone
  Ryan Suarez
  Temoc Suarez
  Alain Sutter

T
  Carey Talley
  David Texeira
  Hendry Thomas
  Shavar Thomas
  Abe Thompson
  Jason Thompson
  Juan Toja
  Jonathan Top
  Daniel Torres
  John Jairo Tréllez
  Mickey Trotman

U
  Victor Ulloa
  Mandi Urbas
  Maximiliano Urruti

V
  Joselito Vaca
  Simo Valakari
  Dave van den Bergh
  Greg Vanney
  Ricardo Villar

W
  David Wagenfuhr
  Blake Wagner
  Nick Walker †
  Anthony Wallace
  Bobby Warshaw
  Dante Washington
  Jamie Watson †
  Je-Vaughn Watson
  Wade Webber
  Andrew Wiedeman
  Chase Wileman
  Kirk Wilson
  Mark Wilson
  London Woodberry

Y
  Jason Yeisley
  Alex Yi

Z
  Alex Zendejas
  Walker Zimmerman

References

Sources
 

Dallas
 
Association football player non-biographical articles